Seenigama or Seenigama Devol is a village on the south coast of Sri Lanka. Seenigama is known for a temple dedicated to Devol, a deity in Sinhala Buddhist mythology.

References

Populated places in Southern Province, Sri Lanka